The Victorian Premier's Prize for Drama is a prize category in the annual Victorian Premier's Literary Awards. The winner of this category prize vies with four other category winners (fiction; non-fiction; poetry; young adult literature) for overall Victorian Prize for Literature.

Until 2012, the award was called the Louis Esson Prize for Drama.

Victorian Premier's Prize for Drama 
Winners of the Overall Victorian Prize for Literature have a blue ribbon.

Louis Esson Prize for Drama

Notes

References

Victorian Premier's Literary Awards
Australian theatre awards
Awards established in 1985